Jiuzhang is the first photonic quantum computer to claim quantum supremacy. Previously quantum supremacy has been achieved only once in 2019 by Google’s Sycamore, however Google's computer was based on superconducting materials, and not photons.

Jiuzhang was developed by a team from University of Science and Technology of China (USTC) led by Pan Jianwei and Lu Chaoyang. The computer is named after Jiuzhang suanshu, an ancient Chinese mathematical classic.

On 3 December 2020, USTC announced in Science that Jiuzhang successfully performed Gaussian boson sampling in 200 seconds, with a maximum of 76 detected photons. The USTC group estimated that it would take 2.5 billion years for the Sunway TaihuLight supercomputer to perform the same calculation. In addition to a quantum computational advantage, Jiuzhang has a Hilbert space 10 billion times larger than Google's superconductor-based Sycamore processor, and as such, is harder to simulate classically.

Experimental setup

The setup involves a Verdi-pumped Mira 900 Ti:sapphire laser which is split into 13 paths of equal intensity and then shined on 25 PPKTP crystals to produce 25 two-mode squeezed states. Through a hybrid encoding this is equivalent to 50 single-mode squeezed states. The purity is increased from 98% to 99% by 12nm filtering. The 50 single-mode squeezed states are sent into a 100-mode interferometer and sampled by 100 single-photon detectors with an efficiency of 81%.

References

2020 in science
University of Science and Technology of China
Quantum computing
Supercomputing in China